Alfredo Martinelli (7 March 1899 – 11 November 1968) was an Italian film actor. He appeared in 103 films between 1916 and 1967. He was born and died in Siena, Tuscany.

Selected filmography

 I Topi Grigi (1918)
 Tortured Soul (1919)
 Il teschio d'oro (1920)
 The Second Wife (1922)
 The White Sister (1923)
 La dama de Chez Maxim's (1923)
 Romola (1924)
 The Faces of Love (1924)
 The Fiery Cavalcade (1925)
 The Last Days of Pompeii (1926)
 Floretta and Patapon (1927)
 The Storyteller of Venice (1929)
 Assunta Spina (1930)
 The Charmer (1931)
 Resurrection (1931)
 Before the Jury (1931)
 Figaro and His Great Day (1931)
 The Devil's Lantern (1931)
 The Private Secretary (1931)
 The Opera Singer (1932)
 Paradise (1932)
 Seconda B (1934)
 Everybody's Woman (1934)
 A Woman Between Two Worlds (1936)
 Adam's Tree (1936)
 Hands Off Me! (1937)
 The Ferocious Saladin (1937)
 It Always Ends That Way (1939)
 Heartbeat (1939)
 No Man's Land (1939)
 Eternal Melodies (1940)
 Red Tavern (1940)
 A Romantic Adventure (1940)
 Kean (1940)
 Two on a Vacation (1940)
 The Man on the Street  (1941)
 The Secret Lover (1941)
 The Hero of Venice (1941)
 A Husband for the Month of April (1941)
 The Countess of Castiglione (1942)
 Fedora (1942)
 Don Cesare di Bazan (1942)
 Two Hearts Among the Beasts (1943)
 The Peddler and the Lady (1943)
 Annabella's Adventure (1943)
 The Adulteress (1946)

References

External links

1899 births
1968 deaths
20th-century Italian male actors
Italian male film actors
Italian male silent film actors
People from Siena